This is a list of the mammal species recorded in the Gambia. Of the mammal species in the Gambia, one is critically endangered, three are endangered, and six are vulnerable.

The following tags are used to highlight each species' conservation status as assessed by the International Union for Conservation of Nature:

Some species were assessed using an earlier set of criteria. Species assessed using this system have the following instead of near threatened and least concern categories:

Order: Tubulidentata (aardvarks) 

The order Tubulidentata consists of a single species, the aardvark. Tubulidentata are characterised by their teeth which lack a pulp cavity and form thin tubes which are continuously worn down and replaced.

Family: Orycteropodidae
Genus: Orycteropus
 Aardvark, O. afer

Order: Hyracoidea (hyraxes) 

The hyraxes are any of four species of fairly small, thickset, herbivorous mammals in the order Hyracoidea. About the size of a domestic cat they are well-furred, with rounded bodies and a stumpy tail. They are native to Africa and the Middle East.

Family: Procaviidae (hyraxes)
Genus: Dendrohyrax
 Western tree hyrax, Dendrohyrax dorsalis LC

Order: Proboscidea (elephants) 

The elephants comprise three living species and are the largest living land animals.

Family: Elephantidae (elephants)
Genus: Loxodonta
African forest elephant, L. cyclotis  extirpated

Order: Sirenia (manatees and dugongs) 

Sirenia is an order of fully aquatic, herbivorous mammals that inhabit rivers, estuaries, coastal marine waters, swamps, and marine wetlands. All four species are endangered.

Family: Trichechidae
Genus: Trichechus
 African manatee, Trichechus senegalensis VU

Order: Primates 

The order Primates contains humans and their closest relatives: lemurs, lorisoids, tarsiers, monkeys, and apes.

Suborder: Strepsirrhini
Infraorder: Lemuriformes
Superfamily: Lorisoidea
Family: Lorisidae
Genus: Perodicticus
 Potto, Perodicticus potto LR/lc
Family: Galagidae
Genus: Galago
 Senegal bushbaby, Galago senegalensis LR/lc
Suborder: Haplorhini
Infraorder: Simiiformes
Parvorder: Catarrhini
Superfamily: Cercopithecoidea
Family: Cercopithecidae (Old World monkeys)
Genus: Erythrocebus
 Patas monkey, Erythrocebus patas LR/lc
Genus: Chlorocebus
 Green monkey, Chlorocebus sabaeus LR/lc
Genus: Cercopithecus
 Campbell's mona monkey, Cercopithecus campbelli LR/lc
 Lesser spot-nosed monkey, Cercopithecus petaurista LR/lc
Genus: Papio
 Guinea baboon, Papio papio LR/nt
Subfamily: Colobinae
Genus: Colobus
 King colobus, Colobus polykomos LR/nt
Genus: Procolobus
 Red colobus, Procolobus badius EN
Superfamily: Hominoidea
Family: Hominidae (great apes)
Subfamily: Homininae
Tribe: Panini
Genus: Pan
 Common chimpanzee, Pan troglodytes EN - regionally extinct

Order: Rodentia (rodents) 

Rodents make up the largest order of mammals, with over 40% of mammalian species. They have two incisors in the upper and lower jaw which grow continually and must be kept short by gnawing.

Suborder: Hystricognathi
Family: Hystricidae (Old World porcupines)
Genus: Atherurus
 African brush-tailed porcupine, Atherurus africanus LC
Genus: Hystrix
 Crested porcupine, Hystrix cristata LC
Family: Thryonomyidae (cane rats)
Genus: Thryonomys
 Greater cane rat, Thryonomys swinderianus LC
Suborder: Sciurognathi
Family: Sciuridae (squirrels)
Subfamily: Xerinae
Tribe: Xerini
Genus: Xerus
 Striped ground squirrel, Xerus erythropus LC
Tribe: Protoxerini
Genus: Funisciurus
 Fire-footed rope squirrel, Funisciurus pyrropus LC
Genus: Heliosciurus
 Gambian sun squirrel, Heliosciurus gambianus LC
 Red-legged sun squirrel, Heliosciurus rufobrachium LC
Family: Gliridae (dormice)
Subfamily: Graphiurinae
Genus: Graphiurus
 Kellen's dormouse, Graphiurus kelleni LC
Family: Nesomyidae
Subfamily: Cricetomyinae
Genus: Cricetomys
 Gambian pouched rat, Cricetomys gambianus LC
Family: Muridae (mice, rats, voles, gerbils, hamsters, etc.)
Subfamily: Gerbillinae
Genus: Tatera
 Kemp's gerbil, Tatera gambiana LC
 Guinean gerbil, Tatera guineae LC
Genus: Taterillus
 Slender gerbil, Taterillus gracilis LC
 Senegal tateril, Taterillus pygargus LC
Subfamily: Murinae
Genus: Arvicanthis
 African grass rat, Arvicanthis niloticus LC
Genus: Dasymys
 West African shaggy rat, Dasymys rufulus LC
Genus: Lemniscomys
 Heuglin's striped grass mouse, Lemniscomys zebra LC
Genus: Mastomys
 Guinea multimammate mouse, Mastomys erythroleucus LC
 Hubert's multimammate mouse, Mastomys huberti LC
Genus: Mus
 African pygmy mouse, Mus minutoides LC
Genus: Praomys
 Dalton's mouse, Praomys daltoni LC
 Tullberg's soft-furred mouse, Praomys tullbergi LC

Order: Lagomorpha (lagomorphs) 

The lagomorphs comprise two families, Leporidae (hares and rabbits), and Ochotonidae (pikas). Though they can resemble rodents, and were classified as a superfamily in that order until the early 20th century, they have since been considered a separate order. They differ from rodents in a number of physical characteristics, such as having four incisors in the upper jaw rather than two.

Family: Leporidae (rabbits, hares)
Genus: Lepus
 African savanna hare, Lepus microtis LR/lc

Order: Erinaceomorpha (hedgehogs and gymnures) 

The order Erinaceomorpha contains a single family, Erinaceidae, which comprise the hedgehogs and gymnures. The hedgehogs are easily recognised by their spines while gymnures look more like large rats.

Family: Erinaceidae (hedgehogs)
Subfamily: Erinaceinae
Genus: Atelerix
 Four-toed hedgehog, Atelerix albiventris LR/lc

Order: Soricomorpha (shrews, moles, and solenodons) 

The "shrew-forms" are insectivorous mammals. The shrews and solenodons closely resemble mice while the moles are stout-bodied burrowers.

Family: Soricidae (shrews)
Subfamily: Crocidurinae
Genus: Crocidura
 Cinderella shrew, Crocidura cinderella LC
 Fox's shrew, Crocidura foxi LC
 Bicolored musk shrew, Crocidura fuscomurina LC
 Lamotte's shrew, Crocidura lamottei LC
 Mauritanian shrew, Crocidura lusitania LC

Order: Chiroptera (bats) 

The bats' most distinguishing feature is that their forelimbs are developed as wings, making them the only mammals capable of flight. Bat species account for about 20% of all mammals.

Family: Pteropodidae (flying foxes, Old World fruit bats)
Subfamily: Pteropodinae
Genus: Eidolon
 Straw-coloured fruit bat, Eidolon helvum LC
Genus: Epomophorus
 Gambian epauletted fruit bat, Epomophorus gambianus LC
Genus: Lissonycteris
 Smith's fruit bat, Lissonycteris smithi LC
Genus: Micropteropus
 Peters's dwarf epauletted fruit bat, Micropteropus pusillus LC
Genus: Rousettus
 Egyptian fruit bat, Rousettus aegyptiacus LC
Family: Vespertilionidae
Subfamily: Vespertilioninae
Genus: Glauconycteris
 Butterfly bat, Glauconycteris variegata LC
Genus: Neoromicia
 Tiny serotine, Neoromicia guineensis LC
 Banana pipistrelle, Neoromicia nanus LC
 Rendall's serotine, Neoromicia rendalli LC
 White-winged serotine, Neoromicia tenuipinnis LC
Genus: Scotoecus
 Light-winged lesser house bat, Scotoecus albofuscus DD
 Dark-winged lesser house bat, Scotoecus hirundo DD
Genus: Scotophilus
 African yellow bat, Scotophilus dinganii LC
 White-bellied yellow bat, Scotophilus leucogaster LC
 Greenish yellow bat, Scotophilus viridis LC
Family: Molossidae
Genus: Chaerephon
 Little free-tailed bat, Chaerephon pumila LC
Genus: Mops
 Angolan free-tailed bat, Mops condylurus LC
 Midas free-tailed bat, Mops midas LC
Family: Emballonuridae
Genus: Taphozous
 Mauritian tomb bat, Taphozous mauritianus LC
 Egyptian tomb bat, Taphozous perforatus LC
Family: Nycteridae
Genus: Nycteris
 Gambian slit-faced bat, Nycteris gambiensis LC
 Hairy slit-faced bat, Nycteris hispida LC
 Large-eared slit-faced bat, Nycteris macrotis LC
 Egyptian slit-faced bat, Nycteris thebaica LC
Family: Megadermatidae
Genus: Lavia
 Yellow-winged bat, Lavia frons LC
Family: Rhinolophidae
Subfamily: Rhinolophinae
Genus: Rhinolophus
 Rüppell's horseshoe bat, Rhinolophus fumigatus LC
 Lander's horseshoe bat, Rhinolophus landeri LC
Subfamily: Hipposiderinae
Genus: Asellia
 Trident leaf-nosed bat, Asellia tridens LC
Genus: Hipposideros
 Sundevall's roundleaf bat, Hipposideros caffer LC
 Cyclops roundleaf bat, Hipposideros cyclops LC
 Noack's roundleaf bat, Hipposideros ruber LC

Order: Pholidota (pangolins) 

The order Pholidota comprises the eight species of pangolin. Pangolins are anteaters and have the powerful claws, elongated snout and long tongue seen in the other unrelated anteater species.

Family: Manidae
Genus: Manis
 Long-tailed pangolin, Manis tetradactyla LR/lc
 Tree pangolin, Manis tricuspis LR/lc

Order: Cetacea (whales) 

The order Cetacea includes whales, dolphins and porpoises. They are the mammals most fully adapted to aquatic life with a spindle-shaped nearly hairless body, protected by a thick layer of blubber, and forelimbs and tail modified to provide propulsion underwater.

Suborder: Mysticeti
Family: Balaenopteridae
Subfamily: Balaenopterinae
Genus: Balaenoptera
 Common minke whale, Balaenoptera acutorostrata VU
 Sei whale, Balaenoptera borealis EN
 Bryde's whale, Balaenoptera brydei EN
 Blue whale, Balaenoptera musculus EN
 Fin whale, Balaenoptera physalus EN
Subfamily: Megapterinae
Genus: Megaptera
 Humpback whale, Megaptera novaeangliae VU
Suborder: Odontoceti
Superfamily: Platanistoidea
Family: Phocoenidae
Genus: Phocoena
 Harbour porpoise, Phocoena phocoena VU
Family: Physeteridae
Genus: Physeter
 Sperm whale, Physeter macrocephalus VU
Family: Kogiidae
Genus: Kogia
 Pygmy sperm whale, Kogia breviceps DD
 Dwarf sperm whale, Kogia sima DD
Family: Ziphidae
Genus: Mesoplodon
 Blainville's beaked whale, Mesoplodon densirostris DD
 Gervais' beaked whale, Mesoplodon europaeus DD
Genus: Ziphius
 Cuvier's beaked whale, Ziphius cavirostris DD
Family: Delphinidae (marine dolphins)
Genus: Orcinus
 Killer whale, Orcinus orca DD
Genus: Feresa
 Pygmy killer whale, Feresa attenuata DD
Genus: Pseudorca
 False killer whale, Pseudorca crassidens DD
Genus: Delphinus
 Short-beaked common dolphin, Delphinus delphis LR/cd
Genus: Lagenodelphis
 Fraser's dolphin, Lagenodelphis hosei DD
Genus: Stenella
 Pantropical spotted dolphin, Stenella attenuata LR/cd
 Clymene dolphin, Stenella clymene DD
 Striped dolphin, Stenella coeruleoalba DD
 Atlantic spotted dolphin, Stenella frontalis DD
 Spinner dolphin, Stenella longirostris LR/cd
Genus: Steno
 Rough-toothed dolphin, Steno bredanensis DD
Genus: Tursiops
 Common bottlenose dolphin, Tursiops truncatus LC
Genus: Globicephala
 Short-finned pilot whale, Globicephala macrorhynchus DD
Genus: Grampus
 Risso's dolphin, Grampus griseus DD
Genus: Peponocephala
 Melon-headed whale, Peponocephala electra DD

Order: Carnivora (carnivorans) 

There are over 260 species of carnivorans, the majority of which feed primarily on meat. They have a characteristic skull shape and dentition.
Suborder: Feliformia
Family: Felidae (cats)
Subfamily: Felinae
Genus: Caracal
 Caracal, C. caracal 
African golden cat, C. aurata  presence uncertain
Genus: Felis
African wildcat, F. lybica 
Genus: Leptailurus
 Serval, Leptailurus serval 
Subfamily: Pantherinae
Genus: Panthera
 Leopard, P. pardus  possibly extirpated
Family: Viverridae
Subfamily: Viverrinae
Genus: Civettictis
 African civet, Civettictis civetta 
Genus: Genetta
 Rusty-spotted genet, Genetta maculata 
Family: Herpestidae (mongooses)
Genus: Helogale
 Common dwarf mongoose, Helogale parvula 
Genus: Herpestes
 Egyptian mongoose, Herpestes ichneumon 
Genus: Mungos
 Gambian mongoose, Mungos gambianus 
Family: Hyaenidae (hyaenas)
Genus: Crocuta
 Spotted hyena, Crocuta crocuta 
Suborder: Caniformia
Family: Canidae (dogs, foxes)
Genus: Lupulella
 Side-striped jackal, L. adusta  
Genus: Lycaon
 African wild dog, L. pictus  extirpated
Family: Mustelidae (mustelids)
Genus: Ictonyx
 Striped polecat, Ictonyx striatus 
Genus: Mellivora
 Honey badger, Mellivora capensis 
Genus: Aonyx
 African clawless otter, Aonyx capensis 
Family: Phocidae (earless seals)
Genus: Monachus
 Mediterranean monk seal, M. monachus  possibly extirpated

Order: Artiodactyla (even-toed ungulates) 

The even-toed ungulates are ungulates whose weight is borne about equally by the third and fourth toes, rather than mostly or entirely by the third as in perissodactyls. There are about 220 artiodactyl species, including many that are of great economic importance to humans.

Family: Hippopotamidae (hippopotamuses)
Genus: Hippopotamus
 Hippopotamus, Hippopotamus amphibius VU
Family: Bovidae (cattle, antelope, sheep, goats)
Subfamily: Alcelaphinae
Genus: Alcelaphus
 Hartebeest, Alcelaphus buselaphus LC extirpated
Genus: Damaliscus
 Topi, Damaliscus lunatus LC extirpated
Subfamily: Antilopinae
Genus: Gazella
 Red-fronted gazelle, Gazella rufifrons VU
Genus: Ourebia
 Oribi, Ourebia ourebi LR/cd
Subfamily: Bovinae
Genus: Syncerus
 African buffalo, Syncerus caffer LC extirpated
Genus: Tragelaphus
 Giant eland, Tragelaphus derbianus LC extirpated
 Bushbuck, Tragelaphus scriptus LR/lc
 Sitatunga, Tragelaphus spekii LR/nt
Subfamily: Cephalophinae
Genus: Cephalophus
 Maxwell's duiker, Cephalophus maxwellii LR/nt
 Red-flanked duiker, Cephalophus rufilatus LR/cd
 Yellow-backed duiker, Cephalophus silvicultor LC extirpated
Genus: Sylvicapra
 Common duiker, Sylvicapra grimmia LR/lc
Subfamily: Hippotraginae
Genus: Hippotragus
 Roan antelope, Hippotragus equinus LC possibly extirpated
Subfamily: Reduncinae
Genus: Kobus
 Waterbuck, Kobus ellipsiprymnus LR/cd
 Kob, Kobus kob LR/cd
Genus: Redunca
 Bohor reedbuck, Redunca redunca LR/cd

Notes

References

See also
List of chordate orders
Lists of mammals by region
List of prehistoric mammals
Mammal classification
List of mammals described in the 2000s

Gambia
Gambia

Mammals
Fauna of the Gambia